KPDR-LP, virtual channel 19 (UHF digital channel 22), is a low-power YTA TV-affiliated television station licensed to Salt Lake City, Utah, United States. The station is owned by Craig Caples, Marilyn Caples, and William Mitchell. Founded in 2004, the station currently broadcasts from Kessler Peak in the Oquirrh Mountains.

Subchannels
The station's digital signal is multiplexed:

See also
List of Salt Lake City media

References

External links
TV Fool Map for KPDR

PDR-LD
2004 establishments in Utah
Television channels and stations established in 2004
Low-power television stations in the United States
YTA TV affiliates
Classic Reruns TV affiliates